Arturo Naelson Cárdenas Delgado (born 15 April 1999) is a Mexican professional footballer who plays as a defender.

International career
In April 2019, Cárdenas was included in the 21-player squad to represent Mexico at the U-20 World Cup in Poland.

Career statistics

Club

Honours
Atlante
Liga de Expansión MX: Apertura 2022

References

1999 births
Living people
Mexican footballers
Association football defenders
C.F. Monterrey players
Querétaro F.C. footballers
Mexico under-20 international footballers